Yazdan Chah (also Romanized as Yazdān Chāh; also known as Gaz Deh) is a village in Arabkhaneh Rural District, Shusef District, Nehbandan County, South Khorasan Province, Iran. At the 2006 census, its population was 38, in 7 families.

References 

Populated places in Nehbandan County